Matern von Marschall (born 3 August 1962) is a German politician of the Christian Democratic Union (CDU) who served as a member of the Bundestag from the state of Baden-Württemberg from 2013 until 2021.

Political career 
Von Marschall first became a member of the Bundestag in the 2013 German federal election. He was a member of the Committee on European Union Affairs and the Committee on Economic Cooperation and Development.

In addition to his committee assignments, von Marschall was a member of the German delegation to the Parliamentary Assembly of the Council of Europe (PACE) from 2018 until 2021. In this capacity, he served on the Assembly's Committee on Rules of Procedure, Immunities and Institutional Affairs; the Committee on Social Affairs, Health and Sustainable Development; and the Sub-Committee on Public Health and Sustainable Development. From 2019 until 2021, he was also a member of the German delegation to the Franco-German Parliamentary Assembly.

Other activities 
 Deutsche Gesellschaft für Internationale Zusammenarbeit (GIZ), Chairman of the Board of Trustees
 German Institute for Development Evaluation (DEval), Member of the Advisory Board
 Franco-German Youth Office (FGYO), Member of the Board of Governors (since 2018)
 Rotary International, Member

Political positions
In June 2017, von Marschall voted against Germany's introduction of same-sex marriage.

Ahead of the 2021 national elections, von Marschall endorsed Markus Söder as the Christian Democrats' joint candidate to succeed Chancellor Angela Merkel.

References

External links 

 Bundestag biography 

1962 births
Living people
Members of the Bundestag for Baden-Württemberg
Members of the Bundestag 2017–2021
Members of the Bundestag 2013–2017
Members of the Bundestag for the Christian Democratic Union of Germany